Jaana Padrik (born 23 June 1958, in Tallinn) is an Estonian journalist and politician. She was a member of IX Riigikogu.

She has been a member of Pro Patria Union.

References

Living people
1958 births
Estonian journalists
Estonian radio personalities
Pro Patria Union politicians
Members of the Riigikogu, 1999–2003
Women members of the Riigikogu
Academic staff of the University of Tartu
Tallinn University alumni
Politicians from Tallinn
People from Tallinn
21st-century Estonian women politicians